Talking to a Stranger is the second single by Australian pub rock band Hunters & Collectors, released in 1982. It was the only single to be released from Hunters & Collectors debut album. The song reached number 59 on the Australian chart. "Talking to a Stranger", was released ahead of the album on 12 July, and was accompanied by a music video directed by film maker Richard Lowenstein, but it did not reach the Top 50 on the related singles chart.

Background 
Australian pub rockers Hunters & Collectors released "Talking to a Stranger" on 12 July 1982 ahead of their debut studio album, Hunters & Collectors which appeared in July.
The track was co-written by band members John Archer on bass guitar, Doug Falconer on drums, Ray Tosti-Guerra on guitar, vocals, Robert Miles on live sound, Mark Seymour on lead vocals and guitar, Greg Perano on percussion, and Geoff Crosby on keyboards. In 2013 a cover version of "Talking to a Stranger" by Birds of Tokyo appeared on the tribute album, Crucible – The Songs of Hunters & Collectors.

Reception
At the 1982 Countdown Music Awards, the song was nominated for Best Debut Single.

Named by Double J as one of the best debut singles of all time, they said, "following in the footsteps of Germany's Krautrock pioneers. With huge horns and metallic percussion, Hunters & Collectors showed few signs of emerging beyond Melbourne's underground. With their debut single soon after, it appeared nothing would change. It was a seven-and-a-half-minute epic with jagged guitars, a thundering rhythm, a barking vocal, and an opening line nicked from Charles Baudelaire."

Track listing

Personnel 
Hunters & Collectors members
 John Archer – electric bass
 Geoff Crosby – keyboards
 Doug Falconer – drums
 Robert Miles – live sound, art director
 Greg Perano – percussion
 Mark Seymour – guitar, lead vocals
 Ray Tosti-Guerra – guitar, vocals

Charts

References

External links 
 Video of "Talking To A Stranger"

Hunters & Collectors songs
1982 songs
1982 singles
Mushroom Records singles
Songs written by Mark Seymour